Phensuximide is an anticonvulsant in the succinimide class.

External links
 
 

Succinimides